McGlynn is an Irish surname. Notable persons with the name include:
Aileen McGlynn (born 1973), Scottish paralympic tandem cyclist
Arty McGlynn (1944–2019), Irish guitarist
Ben McGlynn (born 1985), Australian rules football player playing for the Sydney Swans
Dick McGlynn (born 1948), retired professional ice hockey player
Edward McGlynn (1837–1900), American Roman Catholic priest and social reformer
Frank McGlynn, Sr. (1866–1951), American film actor
Gareth McGlynn (born 1982), midfielder for Derry City
Gerard McGlynn, American retired soccer midfielder
Ian McGlynn (born 1973), American singer-songwriter
Joe McGlynn (born 2002), forward for Kidderminster Harriers on loan from Burnley

John McGlynn (actor), Scottish actor
John McGlynn (Gaelic footballer), Kerry player
John McGlynn (Scottish footballer), association football player and manager (Heart of Midlothian FC)
John H. McGlynn, American editor/translator
Joseph Leo McGlynn, Jr. (1925–1999), United States federal judge
Karyna McGlynn (born 1977), American poet
Katherine A. McGlynn, American cancer epidemiologist 
Katie McGlynn (born 1993), British actress
Mary Elizabeth McGlynn (born 1966), American voice actress, ADR director, writer, and singer
Michael McGlynn (born 1964), Irish composer
 Michael McGlynn (swimmer) (born 2000), South African marathon swimmer
Michael J. McGlynn, mayor of Medford, Massachusetts
Mike McGlynn (born 1985), American football center for the Philadelphia Eagles
Molly McGlynn, Canadian film and television director and screenwriter
Pat McGlynn (born 1958), rhythm guitarist for the Bay City Rollers
Ryan McGlynn (born 1974), co-owner of McGlynn Racing
Stoney McGlynn (1872–1941), professional baseball pitcher
Vic McGlynn (born 1978), English radio presenter and disc jockey

See also 

 McGluwa
 McLuhan
 McLucas
 McLuckie

Surnames
Surnames of Irish origin
Surnames of British Isles origin
Anglicised Irish-language surnames